Powell National Forest was established by the U.S. Forest Service in Utah on July 1, 1908 with the renaming of Aquarius National Forest for John Wesley Powell.  On July 1, 1922 the eastern division of Sevier National Forest was added to Powell. On October 1, 1944 the entire forest was transferred to Dixie National Forest

References

External links
Forest History Society
Listing of the National Forests of the United States and Their Dates (from Forest History Society website) Text from Davis, Richard C., ed. Encyclopedia of American Forest and Conservation History. New York: Macmillan Publishing Company for the Forest History Society, 1983. Vol. II, pp. 743-788.

Former National Forests of Utah